Conquest is a strategy board game created and published by Donald Benge. First published in 1972 with cardboard pieces, it evolved to plastic pieces and a deluxe set in pewter plated in various metals including gold.

Description
Conquest is a non-historical two-player game of conquest based on point to point movement and capture. The map features both land and water. Each player has 20 land pieces — soldiers, elephants, chariots, and knights — each with different capabilities, and 6 ship pieces. Pieces can be stacked; for example, a soldier can mount a chariot, and both can then board a ship.

The object of the game is either to occupy all five spaces in the opponent's capital city, or to capture all the opponent's pieces.

The game also includes a set of puzzles for solitaire play.

Gameplay
Each player can make ten moves per turn (five on White's first). A unit may not move more than once per turn unless it captures or gives check (in either case the opponent has the right to immediately recapture if possible or otherwise parry a check). If a piece makes a capture, it can move its full movement allowance again in the same turn if the player has action points left. After a capture, the opponent may attempt a recapture move.

Publication history
Conquest was designed by Donald Benge of Burbank, California, who self-published it in 1972. Two years later, Benge developed a four-player edition, also titled Conquest. The four-player version can be played as a free for all, with two teams of two. Benge then published Conquest Plus, which introduced catapults and siege engines.

In 1977, Benge developed a chess variant called Quest Chess, based on principles from Conquest.

In 2006, Bütehorn Spiele (Buchholz Verlag), released a German-language edition. In 2006, Conquest Games released a new edition, Grand Conquest, which added camels and castles with moats, and introduced movement into the fields between the regular movement points.

On April 6, 2007, Donald was killed in a traffic accident by a drunk driver, and publishing activities were suspended until the game was bought by Numbskull Games in 2010.

Reception
In Issue 2 of Command, Donald Agosta called the game "fast moving and excellent for people who enjoy chess, backgammon, etc." He did warn that "The hard-core wargamer would probably be disappointed with it, however."

Other recognition
A copy of Conquest is held in the collection of the Strong National Museum of Play (object 116.76330).

Other reviews and commentary
 World Game Review #2
Games
1980 Games 100 in Games
 1981 Games 100 in Games
1982 Games 100 in Games

References

External links
 Forum-based correspondence Conquest and Grand Conquest / rule enquiries
 
 ChessVariants page about Chess Quest
 old Official Conquest Website

Abstract strategy games
Board games introduced in 1972
Board wargames